Duravinskaya is a rural locality (a village) in Nizhnekuloyskoye Rural Settlement, Verkhovazhsky District, Vologda Oblast, Russia. The population was 21 as of 2002. There are 4 streets.

Geography 
Duravinskaya is located 32 km southeast of Verkhovazhye (the district's administrative centre) by road. Drugosimonovskaya is the nearest rural locality.

References 

Rural localities in Verkhovazhsky District